BASIC A+ was developed by Optimized Systems Software of Cupertino, California, United States, to provide the Atari 8-bit family with an extended BASIC compatible with the simpler ROM-based Atari BASIC. This interpreter was developed by the same team that developed Atari BASIC. While Atari BASIC came on an 8 KB ROM cartridge, BASIC A+ was delivered on floppy disk and uses 15 KB of the computer's RAM, leaving 23 KB available for user programs in a 48 KB Atari 800. Being an extension of Atari BASIC, BASIC A+ came with a supplement to the former's reference manual as its documentation. In addition to being faster than its ROM-bound counterpart, BASIC A+ provides extra commands for DOS operations, player/missile graphics, and debugging.

BASIC A+ was followed by the cartridge-based BASIC XL, and then BASIC XE.

See also 
 Turbo-Basic XL

References 

1983 software
BASIC interpreters
Discontinued BASICs
Optimized Systems Software
Atari 8-bit family software